The Ivy Experimental High School is located in the centre of Zhangjiagang, Jiangsu Province. It consists of two campuses.

The school consists of three departments: a middle school department, high school department, and international department. It has 48 classes, with an enrollment of more than 2,000 students, and more than 200 teachers. Extracurricular activities include a choir and aerobics team.

The school's motto is "Equality, honesty, diligence, courage". Its song is The Song of Ching Chang Cho.

High schools in Jiangsu